George Abell may refer to:

George O. Abell (1927–1983), American astronomer and educator
Sir George Abell (civil servant) (1904–1989), English civil servant in UK and colonial Indian service and cricketer

See also
George Abel (1916–1996), Canadian ice-hockey player
George Clayton Abel, Royal Canadian Air Force officer
Abell (disambiguation)